The East Tennessee State Buccaneers women's basketball represents East Tennessee State University (ETSU) in Johnson City, Tennessee.  ETSU currently competes in the Southern Conference.

History
The Buccaneers began play in 1968. As of the end of the 2016-17 season, they have a 617-649 all-time record. From 1978 to 2005, they played in the Southern Conference. From 2005 to 2014, they played in the Atlantic Sun Conference, winning three conference tournament titles and two regular season titles. In the three NCAA Tournaments they have appeared in, they lost in the First Round each time. They have also made appearances in the NWIT/WNIT in 1994, 2006 and 2014.

NCAA tournament results
The Buccaneers have appeared in three NCAA Tournaments, with a combined record of 0–3.

References

External links